Marava arachidis is a species of little earwig in the family Spongiphoridae. It is found in Africa, Australia, the Caribbean, Europe, Northern Asia (excluding China), North America, South America, and Southern Asia.

References

Further reading

 

Earwigs
Articles created by Qbugbot
Insects described in 1860